Kouider Morabet, better known as Cheb Kader, is a Moroccan singer, songwriter, composer and pioneer of raï music. 
He is born in 1966 in Oran, Algeria.
 
Cheb Kader was barely nine years old when he moved to France to join his father. His father, a musician himself, encouraged his son to play music. The two were even forming a small band together, with Kader's father playing flute and Cheb Kader on percussion. To encourage his son's passion for music,  Cheb Kader's father offered him a guitar and the young Kader began to take music theory classes.

Cheb Kader receives a CAP in auto mechanics in 1982, and went to Paris to pursue his dreams, with a guitar on his shoulder. He saved enough money to produce his first demo and make a start in the professional music scene.

Cheb Kader's meeting with Michel Levy in 1985 will be a turning point in his life. In 1986 he records his first album "Reggae-rai," the first fusion of Rai with other music genres.

He releases his famous eponym album "Cheb Kader" in 1988, which turns to be an international success and was distributed worldwide. His career took off and Cheb Kader began to tour and perform throughout Europe, North Africa, as well as in the United States and Japan.

In 1991, Cheb Kader offers another new album to his fans entitled "Generation Raï".

Unfortunately, conflicts with his record company forced him to withdraw from the art world temporarily.

Cheb Kader is the first pioneer of Raï music in France thanks to the new style he brought to this music, introducing an international approach to his style, as in his epic songs "Sel Dem Drai" or "Sid El Houari" released in 1988, or even former than that, in his first album "Reggae raï" released in 1985, inspiring a whole generation of raï singers of that time. Cheb Kader is considered as the first innovator of the1980's Raï Movement, introducing elements of funk, rock, and reggae into a musical style with origins in the 1920s Algerian traditional music, and the Eastern region of Morocco. It is only in the mid-1980s that Raï is catapulted to the status of world music genre thanks to this new soul added to this music, especially with the arrival of new singers, or "Chebs," both males and females.

In 2002 Cheb Kader announces his comeback to the Raï music scene by signing with "Polydor Universal" his album "Mani", including hits such as "Majiti", "Selou" with its Latin rhythms in tandem with "Sergent Garcia" band, an R&B track "Atir" along with singer "Amel", or "Nsiti" with its gypsy beats. A strong comeback that confirms Cheb Kader as an outstanding Raï singer.

In 2009 he releases the best-of collection called "Dima-Rai".

In 2014 cheb kader is rewarded by the "UNESCO" and "The Moroccan Ministry of Culture" the trophy of "The Best Arab Singer of The Year 2014".

In 2015 Cheb Kader releases "Ma'nensek" with the Sophia Philharmonic Orchestra (Bulgaria), then his single called "Lila Kbira".

in 2016, he releases "Laghyem", a very touching song that preserves a nostalgic touch of traditional melodies, in harmony with well chosen melancholic lyrics.

In 2018 Cheb Kader releases "Nektem" in collaboration with Bahi for music arrangements, and Fatima Zahra El Maaroufi for the lyrics.

Cheb Kader is preparing his 5th album entitled "FUSION", of which he releases his singles "Nadia" and "Liyem".

Cheb Kader who is well known for his distinguished unique style, and his fabulous voice is BACK to Raï music scene!

References

External links
 
 
 Vidéo Clip: "NADIA" de Cheb Kader: après le teaser, voici enfin le single [archive]

1966 births
Living people
20th-century Moroccan male singers
Moroccan emigrants to France
Raï musicians
World Music Awards winners
Moroccan expatriates in Algeria
People from Oran
21st-century Moroccan male singers